Harold Winston "Harry" Beckett (30 May 1935 – 22 July 2010) was a British trumpeter and flugelhorn player of Barbadian origin.

Biography
Born in Bridgetown, Saint Michael, Barbados, Harry Beckett learned to play music in a Salvation Army band. A resident in the UK from 1954, he had an international reputation. He played with Charles Mingus in the 1962 film All Night Long. In the 1960s, he worked and recorded within the band of bass player and composer Graham Collier, retaining the connection over a 16-year period. Beginning in 1970, Beckett led groups of his own, recording for Philips, RCA and Ogun Records among other labels.

Beckett was a key figure of important groups in the British free jazz/improvised music scene, including Ian Carr's Nucleus, the Brotherhood of Breath and The Dedication Orchestra, London Jazz Composers Orchestra, London Improvisers Orchestra, John Surman's Octet, Django Bates, Ronnie Scott's Quintet, Kathy Stobart, Charlie Watts, Stan Tracey's Big Band and Octet; Elton Dean's Ninesense. He also recorded with Keef Hartley, Jah Wobble, David Sylvian and worked with David Murray. He toured abroad with Johnny Dyani, Chris McGregor, Keith Tippett, John Tchicai, Joachim Kühn, Dudu Pukwana's Zila, George Gruntz's Bands, Belgian quintet The Wrong Object, Pierre Dørge's New Jungle Band and Annie Whitehead's Robert Wyatt project, Soupsongs, which also featured Phil Manzanera and Julie Tippetts, among other jazz and rock luminaries.

Beckett's dub-oriented album, The Modern Sound of Harry Beckett, was produced by famed British producer Adrian Sherwood and released on On-U Sound in late 2008.

In 1972, Beckett won the Melody Maker jazz Poll as "Top Trumpeter in Britain". He was a member of the Orchestre National de Jazz between 1997 and 2000.

Beckett died on 22 July 2010 after suffering a stroke.

Discography

References

External links
 Official site archived at Archive.org
Album review at The Guardian

1935 births
2010 deaths
Barbadian expatriates in the United Kingdom
Barbadian jazz trumpeters
English jazz trumpeters
Male trumpeters
Jazz flugelhornists
Nucleus (band) members
British male jazz musicians
Jazz Warriors members
Brotherhood of Breath members
New Jazz Orchestra members
Black British musicians